Acacia aneura var. tenuis is a perennial tree native to Australia.

See also
List of Acacia species

References

aneura var. tenuis
tenuis
Trees of Australia
Fabales of Australia
Flora of New South Wales
Flora of the Northern Territory
Flora of Queensland
Flora of South Australia
Acacias of Western Australia
Drought-tolerant trees
Taxa named by Leslie Pedley